"A Penny for Your Thoughts" is episode 52 of the American television anthology series The Twilight Zone, written by George Clayton Johnson. It originally aired on February 3, 1961, on CBS.

Opening narration

Plot
Hector B. Poole is a sensitive, insecure bank clerk. On the way to work he tosses a coin into a vendor's open box to pay for a newspaper, and it miraculously lands on its edge. Suddenly he can hear other people's thoughts, but does not know what's going on. Distracted, he is nearly hit by a car, and is confused when he hears the driver expressing concern while thinking angrily about Hector's carelessness.

At his place of business, Hector is finalizing the paperwork for a $200,000 loan to a businessman named Sykes, he hears Sykes thinking about using the money for a run at the horse track to win back money he has embezzled from his company. Hector challenges Sykes, who accuses him of lying and withdraws his business from the bank, to the boss Bagby's annoyance.

Next Hector hears an old, trusted employee, Smithers, thinking about how he will steal cash from the bank and escape to Bermuda. He takes Helen Turner, a co-worker who thinks affectionate thoughts about him, fully into his confidence; she doesn't believe in his powers, but urges him to tell Bagby about Smithers. Hector does, saying he overheard Smithers; incredulous at first, Bagby decides to investigate Smithers. Smithers proves to be innocent, and Bagby fires Hector. Smithers then privately admits to Hector that he has fantasized for years about theft, but never goes through with it.

Hector vents his unhappiness to Helen: he's learned more than he wanted to know about the disconnect between people's thoughts and actions. Bagby learns that Sykes has been arrested for gambling with company money, and offers to reinstate Hector. Using blackmail based on knowledge of an affair his boss is having, Hector gets his job back, a raise, and a Bermuda vacation for Smithers.

After work, as Hector returns home with Helen, he returns to the newsstand, where his coin is still standing. Buying an afternoon paper, he knocks it over, and then finds his mind-reading ability gone. He leaves the newsstand with Helen, hopeful about the future.

Closing narration

See also
 List of The Twilight Zone (1959 TV series) episodes

References
DeVoe, Bill. (2008). Trivia from The Twilight Zone. Albany, GA: Bear Manor Media. 
Grams, Martin. (2008). The Twilight Zone: Unlocking the Door to a Television Classic. Churchville, MD: OTR Publishing.

External links
 

1961 American television episodes
The Twilight Zone (1959 TV series season 2) episodes
Television episodes written by George Clayton Johnson
Television episodes about telepathy